MLO may refer to:

 Malibu Locals Only, a group of youths local to Malibu, California, US
 Medio-lateral Oblique, a standard view used in mammography
 Milos Island National Airport, Greece, IATA code
 Mildew resistance locus o, a plant gene family
 Misanthropic Luciferian Order, a Satanic organisation
 Mortgage Loan Originator Housing and Economic Recovery Act of 2008 term for "loan officer"
 Mount Laguna Observatory, near San Diego, California, US
 Mycoplasma-like organism, earliest name for phytoplasmas
 Mauna Loa Observatory, an atmospheric baseline station near Hilo, Hawaii, US